Bullwhip is a 1958 American CinemaScope Western film directed by Harmon Jones and starring Guy Madison and Rhonda Fleming. The film is about a cowboy in Abilene, Kansas who agrees to a marriage to avoid being hanged. The film was shot at Kenny Ranch in Murphys, California. It was the final feature film screenplay of Adele Buffington.

Plot
Steve Daley is about to be hanged for a killing he committed in self-defense when a crooked judge makes him an offer. If he is willing to marry a woman who needs to be wed immediately to collect an inheritance, Steve will be set free. He agrees and is married to a woman identified only as "Julia," who kisses him once and immediately leaves town.

Given an affidavit as proof of his innocence, Steve is turned loose, but immediately fired upon by a gunman, Karp, who works for the town's sheriff. Steve's old sidekick Podo rescues him and together they ride off, angering the sheriff.

On the trail, they meet John Parnell, a fur trader, who reveals that the woman is actually Cheyenne O'Malley, heiress to a prosperous fur business. Parnell wants to be in business with her. He offers a reward to Steve and Podo if they will catch her wagon train and persuade her to see things his way. Behind their backs, Parnell also pays Karp to go after them.

Catching up to her, Steve assumes his rights as a husband, with both the wagons and his wife. Cheyenne resists, cracking her bullwhip at him, though she also has developed romantic feelings toward him. After a falling out, however, Cheyenne steals the affidavit, which is in turn stolen by Karp from her. Cheyenne realizes what she has done and helps Steve put things right, exposing Parnell and beginning a new life together.

Cast
 Guy Madison as Steve Daley
 Rhonda Fleming as Cheyenne O'Malley
 James Griffith as 'Slow' Karp
 Don Beddoe as Judge Carr
 Peter Adams as John Parnell
 Dan Sheridan as Podo
 Burt Nelson as Pine Hawk
 Al Terr as Lem Pierce
 Tim Graham as Pete
 Hank Worden as Tex
 Wayne Mallory as Larry
 Barbara Woodell as Mrs. Sarah Mason
 Rush Williams as Judd
 Don Shelton as Hotel Keeper
 Jack Reynolds as Sheriff

See also
 List of American films of 1958

References

External links
 
 
 

1958 films
1958 Western (genre) films
Allied Artists films
CinemaScope films
American Western (genre) films
Films directed by Harmon Jones
Films scored by Leith Stevens
Films set in Kansas
1950s English-language films
1950s American films